An east wind is a wind that originates in the east and blows in a westward direction. This wind is referenced as symbolism in mythology, poetry and literature.

In mythology
In Greek mythology, Eurus, the east wind, was the only wind not associated with one of the three Greek seasons.  Eurus is also the only one of these four Anemoi not mentioned in Hesiod's Theogony or in the Orphic Hymns.

In Roman mythology the east wind was represented by Vulturnus.

In Native American Iroquois culture, the east wind is said to be brought by O-yan-do-ne, the Moose spirit, whose breath blows grey mist and sends down cold rains upon the earth.

In the Bible

The Authorized King James Version of the English Old Testament makes some seventeen references to the east wind. In Chapter 41 of Genesis, the Pharaoh's dream, which is interpreted by Joseph, describes seven years of grain blasted by the east wind. In Chapters 10 and 14 of Exodus, Moses summons the east wind to bring the locusts that plague Egypt and to part the Red Sea so that the Children of Israel can escape Pharaoh's armies. Several other references exist, most associating the east wind with destruction. Often, this is destruction of the wicked by God.

Literary references
In Hans Christian Andersen's fairy tale, "The Garden of Paradise" (first published in 1839), it is the East Wind who takes the hero to visit the eponymous garden.

In George MacDonald's At the Back of the North Wind (serialized beginning in 1868 and published in book form in 1871), on the other hand, the East Wind is described as more mischievous than strictly evil; the North Wind comments, "...[O]ne does not exactly know how much to believe of what she says, for she is very naughty sometimes..."

Much in the same way, the East Wind symbolizes change in P. L. Travers' Mary Poppins series (published 1934–1988). Mary Poppins arrives at the Banks' house carried by the East Wind, but warns the children that she will only stay until the wind changes. At the end of the book, the West wind carries her away.

Arthur Conan Doyle's Sherlock Holmes story, "His Last Bow" (published in 1917 but set in 1914), ends with Holmes' addressing his assistant Doctor Watson on the eve of the First World War:

Holmes' same speech from "His Last Bow" was used at the end of the 1942 Basil Rathbone Holmes film, Sherlock Holmes and the Voice of Terror, this time in reference to the Second World War. And In the BBC series Sherlock, Holmes's sister, Eurus Holmes, is named after Eurus, the God of the East wind.

In J. R. R. Tolkien's The Lord of the Rings (written in stages between 1937 and 1949), the East Wind, like most other things dealing with the east, is viewed as a thing of evil. In Book III (which appears in The Two Towers), after Aragorn and Legolas have sung a lament for Boromir involving invocations of the other three winds, the following dialogue takes place:

An east wind is referred in Bleak House by Charles Dickens, first published serially between 1852–1853. The character Mr Jarndyce uses it several times as a harbinger of unfavourable events. For example, 

Marianne Moore's poem "Is Your Town Nineveh?" asks, 

In The History of Mr. Polly by H.G. Wells, Mr. Polly is aggravated by an east wind and laments that doctors cannot give us an antidote for it.

See also
Flakpanzer IV "Ostwind" ("East Wind"), a German anti-aircraft vehicle from the Second World War
North wind
Polar easterlies
South wind
West wind
Dongfeng (disambiguation)

References

Greek mythology
Winds

ja:東風